Penn Park is a  park on the campus of the University of Pennsylvania in Philadelphia, Pennsylvania. The park is at South 31st Street and Walnut Street, and features two athletic fields, a multipurpose stadium with 470 seats, a tennis center, a seasonal air structure, and picnic areas. In Fall 2014, Penn partnered with the Philadelphia Orchard Project to establish the Penn Park Orchard in the southeastern corner of the park.

See also
List of parks in Philadelphia

References

External links
Penn Park Overview - University of Pennsylvania

Parks in Philadelphia
Sports venues in Philadelphia
University of Pennsylvania campus